David Albert Cooper  (19 April 1949 – 18 March 2018) was an Australian HIV/AIDS researcher, immunologist, professor at the University of New South Wales, and the director of the Kirby Institute. He and Professor Ron Penny diagnosed the first case of HIV in Australia.

Education
Cooper received a Bachelor of Science from the University of Sydney in 1969 and an MBBS from Sydney Medical School in 1972. After completing his residency at St Vincent's Hospital, he was awarded a postgraduate research scholarship by the University of New South Wales (UNSW) to study immunology.

Career
In 1975, Cooper went to Tucson, Arizona, where he was a research fellow at the University of Arizona Medical Center. He then returned to St Vincent's Hospital in Sydney and was promoted to an immunology staff specialist position in 1979.

Cooper travelled to Boston, Massachusetts and worked as a research fellow in cancer immunology in 1981—the beginning of the outbreak of HIV/AIDS in the United States. Having seen the symptoms of HIV/AIDS in young gay men in the U.S., Cooper returned to Australia and resumed his role at St Vincent's Hospital, where he recognised the same illness in young Australian men who had recently travelled to the U.S. He is credited together with Professor Ron Penny of diagnosing the first case of HIV in Australia in 1982  and published a seminal case series on HIV seroconversion illness in The Lancet in 1985. He also reported the first observation of HIV transmission during breastfeeding in the world in 1985. He was awarded a Doctor of Medicine by UNSW in 1983 and appointed a senior lecturer at the university in 1986. In the same year he was named director of the newly founded National Centre in HIV Epidemiology and Clinical Research (now the Kirby Institute).

In 1991, he was named chair of the WHO Global Program on AIDS committee on clinical research and drug development, and in 1994, he was appointed a full professor and awarded a Doctor of Science by UNSW. In 1996, he and two other HIV/AIDS researchers, Joep Lange from the Netherlands and Praphan Phanuphak from Thailand, founded a research centre in Bangkok named HIV-NAT (HIV Netherlands Australia Thailand Research Collaboration). Cooper, Lange and Phanuphak also established a program to increase access to antiretroviral drugs to treat HIV in Cambodia.

Cooper was director of the Kirby Institute from its establishment in 1986 until his death. He was also a past president of the International AIDS Society.

Personal life

Cooper died at St Vincent's Hospital in Sydney on 18 March 2018 after suffering for a short period from a rare autoimmune inflammatory disease. He was survived by his wife, Dorrie and two daughters, Becky and Ilana.

Honours
Cooper was appointed an Officer of the Order of Australia (AO) in 2003 "for service to medicine as a clinician, researcher and leading contributor in the field of HIV/AIDS research, and to the development of new treatment approaches". He was elected a Fellow of the Australian Academy of Science (FAA) in 2007 and an inaugural Fellow of the Australian Academy of Health and Medical Sciences (FAHMS) in 2015. In 2016, he was awarded the James Cook Medal by the Royal Society of New South Wales.

In 2017 his accomplishments were acknowledged by a motion in the Australian Senate. In recognition of his life's work, Cooper was posthumously appointed Companion of the Order of Australia (AC) in the 2018 Queens's Birthday Honours for "eminent service to medicine, particularly in the area of HIV/AIDS research, as a clinician, scientist and administrator, to the development of treatment therapies, and to health programs in South East Asia and the Pacific".

References

1949 births
2018 deaths
Australian immunologists
Australian Jews
Australian medical researchers
Fellows of the Australian Academy of Health and Medical Sciences
Fellows of the Australian Academy of Science
HIV/AIDS researchers
Medical doctors from Sydney
Officers of the Order of Australia
Companions of the Order of Australia
Sydney Medical School alumni
University of New South Wales alumni
Academic staff of the University of New South Wales
Fellows of the Royal College of Physicians
Fellows of the Royal Australasian College of Physicians
People educated at Cranbrook School, Sydney